Katehari is a constituency of the Uttar Pradesh Legislative Assembly covering the city of Katehari in the Ambedkar Nagar district of Uttar Pradesh, India.

Katehari is one of five assembly constituencies in the Ambedkar Nagar Lok Sabha constituency. Since 2008, this assembly constituency is numbered 277 amongst 403 constituencies.

Election results

2022

2017
Bahujan Samaj Party candidate Lal ji Verma won in last Assembly election of 2017 Uttar Pradesh Legislative Elections defeating Bharatiya Janta Party candidate Awadhesh Kumar Dwiwedi by a margin of 6,287 votes.

References

External links
 

Assembly constituencies of Uttar Pradesh
Ambedkar Nagar district